Caitlin Fields (born September 25, 1995) is an American former pair skater. With her skating partner, Ernie Utah Stevens, she is the 2015 U.S. national junior champion and placed fifth at the 2015 World Junior Championships.

Personal life
The eldest child of Terry and Steve Fields, Caitlin Fields was born September 25, 1995 in Scottsdale, Arizona, She has a younger sister, Emily.

Career

Early career 
Fields skated with Max Settlage early in her career. They won the U.S. juvenile silver medal in the 2007–2008 season and silver on the intermediate level the following year.

Fields teamed up with Jason Pacini in May 2010. They won the novice silver medal at the 2012 U.S. Championships and placed seventh on the junior level at the 2013 U.S. Championships.

In 2013, Fields formed a partnership with Canadian skater Sébastian Arcieri. Coached by Richard Gauthier and Bruno Marcotte in Montreal, they intended to represent Canada but made no competitive appearances together, due to an injury to Arcieri.

Partnership with Stevens 

Fields teamed up with Ernie Utah Stevens in late August 2014. Making their international debut, they won the junior pairs' title at the Toruń Cup in January 2015 in Toruń, Poland. At the 2015 U.S. Championships, held later that month in Greensboro, North Carolina, Fields/Stevens ranked first in both segments of the junior pairs' competition and won gold by a margin of 4.57 points over the silver medalists, Chelsea Liu / Brian Johnson. In March, they placed 7th in the short program, 4th in the free skate, and fifth overall at the World Junior Championships in Tallinn, Estonia. Serguei Zaitsev coached the pair at the Carmel Ice Skadium in Carmel, Indiana.

Fields/Stevens moved up to the senior level for the 2015–2016 season. They placed 8th at the 2015 CS Golden Spin of Zagreb, held in December in Croatia, and 11th at the 2016 U.S. Championships, held in January in Saint Paul, Minnesota.

Fields sustained a concussion in November 2016, resulting in the pair's withdrawal from the 2017 U.S. Championships.

Programs

With Stevens

With Arcieri

With Pacini

Competitive highlights 
CS: Challenger Series

With Stevens

With Pacini

With Settlage

References

External links 

 
 Caitlin Fields / Ernie Utah Stevens at IceNetwork.com

1995 births
American female pair skaters
Living people
Sportspeople from Scottsdale, Arizona
21st-century American women
20th-century American women